The voiced retroflex implosive is a type of consonantal sound. It is not known to be phonemically distinct from alveolar  in any language. Sindhi has an implosive that varies between dental and retroflex articulation, while Oromo, Saraiki and Ngad'a have  but not .

The symbol for this,  (a D with a tail for retroflex and a hook-top for implosive), is not "explicitly" approved by the IPA, but is mentioned in the IPA Handbook.

Features
Features of the voiced retroflex implosive:

Occurrence

See also
 List of phonetics topics

References

External links
 

Implosives
Central consonants
Retroflex consonants
Voiced oral consonants